Joseph Devlin (25 July 1927 – 11 December 2020) was a Scottish professional footballer, who played as a right winger in the Football League.

References

1927 births
2020 deaths
Scottish footballers
Albion Rovers F.C. players
Accrington Stanley F.C. (1891) players
Falkirk F.C. players
Bradford (Park Avenue) A.F.C. players
Rochdale A.F.C. players
Carlisle United F.C. players
Nelson F.C. players
Northwich Victoria F.C. players
English Football League players
Association football wingers
People from Cleland, North Lanarkshire
Footballers from North Lanarkshire